The Norwegian Centre for Human Rights (abbreviated SMR in Norwegian and NCHR in English) is a multidisciplinary research centre at the University of Oslo Faculty of Law. From 2001 to 2015 it was also the ICC (UN) accredited Norwegian national human rights institution.

Directors
 1987–1998: Asbjørn Eide
 1998–2003: Nils Butenschøn
 2004–2007: Geir Ulfstein
 2008: Mads Andenæs
 2009–2014: Nils Butenschøn
 2014–2017 Inga Bostad
 2018– Ragnhild Hennum

References

External links
Official website

National human rights institutions
University of Oslo
Human rights organisations based in Norway